A tiwaf is a type of religious festival in Yazidism.

Overview
Tiwafs are accompanied by numerous rituals which vary from shrine to shrine. These rituals may include performances of the qewwals with their musical instruments, changing and renewing of the coloured strips of cloth (perî) that hang from the spire of the shrine, ritual meals either for the heads of the households or for the whole village, or cooked parts of the sacrificial sheep being auctioned off to bidders among the cheering crowd. The tiwafs in other places also include trips into nature to reach a sacred spot, lending an air of picnic to the occasion, one example is during the tiwaf at the shrine of Kerecal near Sharya, which takes place on a mountain, or at the sacred place of Sexrê Cinê located deep inside the Valley of Jinn near Bozan. In many places, large and communal dances are also included in the tiwafs. Tiwafs are not necessarily attended solely by the locals of the village itself, the participants may also include many of the other Yazidis, particularly the ones who have relatives in the village or have a special attachment with the holy being to which the shrine is dedicated. Together with keeping the Yazidi religious customs alive, tiwafs also serve to strengthen the social ties between families and the communal solidarity, both on the village and inter-village levels.

References

Yazidi holy days